The Falkland Islands Football League (FIFL), Branded Stanley Services Ltd. Football League  is the national governing body of football in the Falkland Islands. The association operates the national team and the Stanley Services League, the only domestic league on the islands. They also sponsor an all-star team from the league, called Stanley F.C. who occasionally play friendly matches against stationed troops on the islands and Royal Navy makeshift teams.

History

Foundation and Stanley FC

Football has been reported to have been played on the Falklands since the late 19th century. The FIFL has recorded their first ever game on the islands to be in 1892. There, a team of the Falkland Islands Defence Force took on the garrison. Throughout this time, prior to World War I, the sport was played frequently amongst the residents of the Falklands. There was a 1913 report in the Falkland Islands Magazine of a football league table that consisted of five teams names as Dazzlers, Sappers, Crusaders, Corinthians and Malvinians. There was also reported the construction of a pavilion in Mr Bradfields Yard.  

The first ever organized football team in the Falklands was regarded as Stanley F.C., which was formed under the power of Jack McNicholl. No official date of when the club began play, but it was reported to have been in existence since 1916. The Falkland Islands Magazine reported this in its 1916 February issue No. X, Vol. XXVIII. in an article "The Stanley Football Club", and stated the club would "...run  two teams, the Colours of the 1st XI. to be Red Jerseys, and the 2nd XI. Green Jerseys: both will play in white shorts...."  

During the 1920s and 1930s, most competitive football matches on the Falkland Islands were of military stationed there over the age of 18. During the latter half of the 1930s, many Falkland Islander boys tried to organize a recreation league on the island, though they were never successful. However, the efforts did prompt two youth teams to form in the 1950s, which were named Jubilee Club and the FI Volunteers Youth, whom occasionally played matches with one another.

Falkland Islands Premiership

A league with 7 teams was formed but the local side was somewhat outclassed by the near professional standard of the Garrison teams and finished 6th. Many of the players who were later to serve the Stanley side for many years earned their baptism against the soldiers who also had their own inter-service competitions. One of the West Yorks who played regularly against the local lads was a young Warrant Officer named Don Clarke, who after the War returned to the Islands and in addition to becoming Chairman of the present Club, also captained the local side from his favoured inside left position.

After the West Yorkshire Regiment was withdrawn and replaced by The Service Corps and Royal Scots detachments a new league was formed with 6 teams – Scots 1 and 11, Corps 1 and 11, the Navy and the Falkland Islands Defence Force. The F.I.D.F. finished as ‘runner-up’ in this League.

Creation of a national team

Following World War II, the name Stanley F.C. was revived, and became the nickname of the national team.

Past teams
These teams have played friendly matches or in previous FIFL seasons:

 Corps 1
 Corps 11
 Falkland Islands Defense Force F.C.
 Falkland Islands Volunteers F.C.
 HMS Manchester F.C.
 Scotts 1
 Scotts 11
 Stanley F.C.
 Tri Services F.C.
 SeaLed PR
 Kelper Store
 Chandelry FC
 Sulivan Blue Sox
 HMS Montrose
 Suppliers
 Tri Service Allstars
 C&R Construction FC
 Falkland Rangers
 Malvina House Hotel FC
 Jim Balfour's Barmy Army
 Falkland Island Holidays FC
 Fire FC
 Clos de Pirque
 House Bashers
 Teenage Mutant Ninja Škrtels
 Great Island Falcons
 Port Stanley
 The Deli
 Lydiate Pumas

Past FIFL League Champions

 1916: Stanley F.C.
 1917: Stanley F.C.
 1918: Stanley F.C.
 1919: Stanley F.C.
 1920: Stanley AC
 1921: Stanley AC
 1922: FI Volunteers
 1923: Stanley AC
 1924: FI Volunteers
 1925: Stanley AC
 1926: Stanley AC
 1927: Stanley AC
 1928: Stanley AC
 1929: Stanley AC
 1930: FI Volunteers
 1931: Stanley AC
 1932: FI Volunteers
 1933: Stanley Service Corps I F.C.
 1934: FI Volunteers
 1935: Jubilee Club
 1936: FI Volunteers
 1937: FI Volunteers
 1938: FI Volunteers
 1939: FIDF
 1940: FI Volunteers
 1941: FIDF
 1942: FIDF
 1943: Stanley Service Corps I F.C.
 1944: FIDF
 1945: FIDF
 1946: Hotspurs
 1947: Stanley Redsox
 1948: Stanley Redsox
 1949: Stanley Redsox
 1950: Stanley Redsox
 1951: Stanley United
 1952: Hotspurs
 1953: Hotspurs
 1954: Hotspurs
 1955: Stanley Dynamos
 1956: Stanley Redsox
 1957: Stanley Redsox
 1958: Hotspurs
 1958-59: Rangers 
 1959-60: Redsox 
 1960-61: Redsox 
 1961-62: Redsox 
 1962-63: Redsox 
 1963-64: Mustangs 
 1964-65: Mustangs 
 1965-66: Mustangs 
 1968-69: Rangers  
 1970-71: Redsox 
 1971-72: Rangers 
 197?: Stanley XI
 1973-74: Mustangs 
 1975-76: Rangers 
 1978-79: Dynamos 
 1982–84: No season due to the Falklands War
 1998–99: Kelper Store Celtics
 1999–00: Hard Disc Rangers
 2000–01: Kelper Store Celtics
 2001–02: Kelper Store Celtics
 2002–03: Kelper Store Celtics
 2003–04: All Saints
 2004–05: Kelper Store Celtics
 2005–06: Penguin News
 2006–07: Globe Tavern Wanderers
 2007–08: Kelper Store Celtics
 2008–09: Kelper Store Celtics
 2009–10: SeaLed PR
 2010–11: Sulivan Bluesox
 2011–12: Chandlery FC
 2012–13: Chandlery FC
 2013–14: not held
 2014–15: FIDF (7-a-side tournament)

References

External links
 FIFL Official Website
 League Facebook Page

Football in the Falkland Islands
National association football premier leagues
Sports organizations established in 1916